The Centre Right Alliance (ACD) was a centre-right political alliance between 2011 and 2013.

History

Formation
The alliance was founded in January 2011 by the National Liberal Party (PNL) and the Conservative Party (PC), when the PC moved away from its longstanding affiliation with the Social Democratic Party (PSD) breaking up the center-left Alliance PSD+PC. The protocol of the alliance however did not include the seat held by the Conservative Party in the European Parliament, as the MEP remained committed to the S&D Group.

The alliance took the colors and electoral sign from the National Liberal Party (PNL), and added the Conservative Party's acronym (PC) in the logo.

Part of the Social Liberal Union (USL)
In 2011, the alliance was part of the Social Liberal Union (USL) together with the Social Democratic Party (PSD) and, since September 2012, the National Union for the Progress of Romania (UNPR), the latter two part of the Centre Left Alliance (ACS).

Dissolution
As of November 2013, the ACD no longer functions as the constituent parties consensually decided to de facto break their respective union citing technical irregularities in the territorial organizations and opposing stands of both party leaders regarding current governmental and political affairs. However, PNL and PC remain part of the larger USL alliance, together with the ACS member parties, PSD and UNPR.

Electoral history

Legislative elections 

Notes:

1 USL was an alliance of two smaller alliances: Centre Left Alliance (ACS) and Centre Right Alliance (ACD). Centre Left Alliance (ACS) members: PSD (58 senators and 149 deputies) and UNPR (5 senators and 10 deputies). Centre Right Alliance members: PNL (51 senators and 101 deputies) and PC (8 senators and 13 deputies).

2 ALDE was created in June 2015 from a merger of PLR (a splinter of PNL) and PC.

References

Conservative parties in Romania
Liberal parties in Romania
Defunct political party alliances in Romania
Defunct liberal political parties